Loucha is a settlement on Zakynthos island, Greece.

Populated places in Zakynthos